Stephen Charles Perrin (born 13 February 1952) is an English former professional footballer who played as a forward, in the Football League for Crystal Palace, Plymouth Argyle, Portsmouth and Northampton Town. He also played non-league football for Wycombe Wanderers, Hillingdon Borough and St. Albans City.

Playing career
Perrin was born in Paddington, Greater London and began his youth career at Queens Park Rangers, before moving to Wycombe Wanderers, then playing in the Isthmian League. He made his debut in the 1973–74 season, going on to make 78 League appearances for the club, scoring 34 goals. In March 1976, Perrin was signed for Crystal Palace by Malcolm Allison.
The next season Perrin made 33 appearances (nine goals) in the Palace team that achieved promotion from the Football League Third Division under Terry Venables. He made a further 15 appearances (four goals) in 1977–78 before moving on to Plymouth Argyle in March that season, where he again played under Allison. After 35 appearances, scoring six goals, Perrin moved to Portsmouth in 1979, where he made 28 appearances (three goals) before moving into non-league football with Hillingdon Borough in 1981.

However, Perrin returned to League football on a non-contract basis with Northampton Town in 1981–82, where he scored six times in 22 appearances. He then returned to Wycombe Wanderers, helping the club to win the Isthmian League in 1983, before concluding his career with Hillingdon Borough and St Albans City.

References

External links

Steve Perrin at greensonscreen.co.uk
Steve Perrin at holmesale.net
Profile at chairboys.co.uk

1952 births
Living people
Footballers from Paddington
English footballers
Association football forwards
Wycombe Wanderers F.C. players
Crystal Palace F.C. players
Plymouth Argyle F.C. players
Portsmouth F.C. players
Hillingdon Borough F.C. players
Northampton Town F.C. players
St Albans City F.C. players
English Football League players
Isthmian League players